Eldena is an unincorporated community in Lee County, Illinois, United States. Its ZIP code is 61324.

History
The community was named after Eldena Van Epp, the wife of an original owner of the town site.

References

Unincorporated communities in Illinois
Populated places established in 1863
Unincorporated communities in Lee County, Illinois